George M. Johnson may refer to:

 George Macness Johnson (1853-1935), Newfoundland lawyer, judge, and politician
 George Metcalf Johnson(1885-1965), American writer of mystery and western novels
 George Johnson (general) (1918-2021), American Air Force Major General
 George M. Johnson (writer) (born 1985), American writer of All Boys Aren't Blue